Thomas Ware Smart (1810 – 28 May 1881), was a politician in colonial New South Wales, Colonial Treasurer in 1863 and 1865.

Smart was born in Sydney, New South Wales, Australia. He was the representative for Sydney Hamlets in the New South Wales Legislative Council from 1 September 1851 to 28 February 1855. He represented Glebe in the New South Wales Legislative Assembly from 1860 to 1869. He was Treasurer from 21 March to 15 October 1863 and from 3 February to 19 October 1865; he was also Secretary for Public Works from 20 October 1865 to 21 January 1866. He was again appointed to the Legislative Council in 1870 and served until his death.

References

 

1810 births
1881 deaths
Members of the New South Wales Legislative Council
Members of the New South Wales Legislative Assembly
Treasurers of New South Wales
Politicians from Sydney
19th-century Australian politicians